The Upper Mississippi River National Wildlife and Fish Refuge is a ,  National Wildlife Refuge located in and along the Upper Mississippi River. It runs from Wabasha, Minnesota in the north to Rock Island, Illinois in the south.

In its northern portion, it is in the Driftless Area, a region of North America that remained free from ice during the last ice age. Certain parcels contained within the refuge were later transferred to the Driftless Area National Wildlife Refuge.

The refuge is an important element of the Mississippi Flyway. It has many wooded islands, sloughs, and hardwood forests. The wildlife found here include the canvasback duck, tundra swan, white-tailed deer, and muskrat. Recreational activities include boating, hunting, fishing, and swimming.

Refuge Headquarters are located in Winona, Minnesota, with district offices located in La Crosse, Wisconsin, Prairie du Chien, Wisconsin, and Thomson, Illinois.

Geography
The refuge is one of only two that spans portions of four states (the other is Silvio O. Conte National Fish and Wildlife Refuge). As of 30 September 2007 the area per state was: Wisconsin: , Iowa: , Minnesota: , Illinois: .

The following counties border on or have land within the Upper Mississippi River National Wildlife and Fish Refuge. In each state, the counties are listed from north to south. The lakes and rivers within the refuge area of each county are also listed.

Minnesota
Wabasha County
Cross Lake
Half Moon Lake
Maloney Lake
McCarthy Lake
Peterson Lake
Robinson Lake
Zumbro River
Winona County
Houston County
Blue Lake
Hayshore Lake
Lawrence Lake
Root River
Target Lake

Wisconsin

Buffalo County
Trempealeau County
La Crosse County
Vernon County
Crawford County
Grant County

Iowa
Allamakee County
Clayton County
Dubuque County
Jackson County
Clinton County
Scott County

Illinois
Jo Daviess County
Carroll County
Whiteside County
Rock Island County

See also
Izaak Walton League
List of National Wildlife Refuges
Trempealeau National Wildlife Refuge
Upper Mississippi River Locks and Dams

References

External links

Upper Mississippi River National Wildlife and Fish Refuge
Stewards of the Upper Mississippi River Wildlife and Fish Refuge

Protected areas of Allamakee County, Iowa
Protected areas of Clayton County, Iowa
Protected areas of Clinton County, Iowa
Protected areas of Dubuque County, Iowa
Driftless Area
Protected areas of Houston County, Minnesota
IUCN Category IV
Protected areas of Jackson County, Iowa
National Wildlife Refuges in Illinois
National Wildlife Refuges in Iowa
National Wildlife Refuges in Minnesota
National Wildlife Refuges in Wisconsin
Protected areas on the Mississippi River
Protected areas established in 1924
Protected areas of Buffalo County, Wisconsin
Protected areas of Carroll County, Illinois
Protected areas of Crawford County, Wisconsin
Protected areas of Grant County, Wisconsin
Protected areas of Jo Daviess County, Illinois
Protected areas of La Crosse County, Wisconsin
Protected areas of Rock Island County, Illinois
Protected areas of Trempealeau County, Wisconsin
Protected areas of Vernon County, Wisconsin
Protected areas of Whiteside County, Illinois
Protected areas of Scott County, Iowa
Protected areas of Winona County, Minnesota
Protected areas of Wabasha County, Minnesota
Ramsar sites in the United States
Wetlands of Illinois
Wetlands of Iowa
Wetlands of Wisconsin
Wetlands of Minnesota
Landforms of Allamakee County, Iowa
Landforms of Clayton County, Iowa
Landforms of Clinton County, Iowa
Landforms of Dubuque County, Iowa
Landforms of Houston County, Minnesota
Landforms of Jackson County, Iowa
Landforms of Buffalo County, Wisconsin
Landforms of Carroll County, Illinois
Landforms of Crawford County, Wisconsin
Landforms of Grant County, Wisconsin
Landforms of Jo Daviess County, Illinois
Landforms of La Crosse County, Wisconsin
Landforms of Rock Island County, Illinois
Landforms of Trempealeau County, Wisconsin
Landforms of Vernon County, Wisconsin
Landforms of Whiteside County, Illinois
Landforms of Scott County, Iowa
Landforms of Winona County, Minnesota
Landforms of Wabasha County, Minnesota
1924 establishments in Wisconsin
1924 establishments in Minnesota
1924 establishments in Illinois
1924 establishments in Iowa